HMS San Domingo was a 74-gun third-rate ship of the line of the Royal Navy, launched on 3 March 1809 at Woolwich. She was sold in 1816.

Career
Magnet disappeared during the voyage and was presumed foundered with all hands.

On 17 January 1813 San Domingo captured the American privateer schooner Teazer.

The British sent boats 15 miles upriver before capturing their prey.

Arab, of seven guns and 45 men, was run aground and boarded by two boats from Marlborough.
Lynx, of six guns and 40 men, hauled down her colours when Borlase went alongside her in San Domingos pinnace.
Racer, of six guns and 38 men, was boarded and carried, after a sharp, resistance, by the San Domingos pinnace.
Dolphin, of 12 guns and 98 men surrendered after Racers guns were turned on her. Dolphin resisted for two hours but then was boarded by men from Statiras large cutter and Maidstones launch.

The British lost two men killed and 11 wounded. The Americans lost six killed and 10 wounded.

The British took three of the schooners into service. The Chesapeake schooner Lynx became . Of the three Baltimore schooners, the Racer became ;  retained her name; lastly, it is not clear what became of Arab.

San Domingo was driven ashore at Halifax, Nova Scotia, British North America, during a gale on 12 November 1813. She was refloated, repaired, and returned to service.

Fate

San Domingo was sold out of the Navy in 1816.

Footnotes

References

Lavery, Brian (2003) The Ship of the Line - Volume 1: The development of the battlefleet 1650-1850. Conway Maritime Press. .

Ships of the line of the Royal Navy
Courageux-class ships of the line
War of 1812 ships of the United Kingdom
1809 ships
Maritime incidents in 1813